
Gmina Przykona is a rural gmina (administrative district) in Turek County, Greater Poland Voivodeship, in west-central Poland.

Villages
Gmina Przykona contains the villages and settlements of Aleksandrów, Bądków Drugi, Bądków Pierwszy, Boleszczyn, Dąbrowa, Ewinów, Gąsin, Jakubka, Jeziorko, Józefina, Kaczki Plastowe, Laski, Młyniska, Olszówka, Paulinów, Posoka, Przykona, Psary, Radyczyny, Radyczyny-Kolonia, Rogów, Sarbice, Słomów Kościelny, Smulsko, Trzymsze, Wichertów, Żeroniczki and Zimotki.

Neighbouring gminas
Gmina Przykona is bordered by the gminas of Brudzew, Dobra, Kawęczyn, Turek and Uniejów.

References
Polish official population figures 2006

Przykona
Turek County